Armenian–Syrian relations are foreign relations between Armenia and Syria. Armenia has an embassy in Damascus and a consulate general in Aleppo. In 1997, Syria opened an embassy in Yerevan. Syrian Foreign Minister Farouk al-Sharaa visited Armenia in March 1992.

Country comparison

History 
Syria established diplomatic relations with Armenia soon after the collapse of the Soviet Union. Syrian President Hafez al-Assad maintained good relationships in part because of the large Armenian community in Syria.

Syrian Civil War 

Despite the country's ongoing Syrian Civil War, the Armenian embassy is still open in Damascus and the countries maintain diplomatic relations.

Following president Bashar al-Assad's victory in the 2014 Syrian presidential election, Armenian president Serzh Sargsyan congratulated Assad, saying, "I wish you Bashar al-Assad good health and successes and I wish the friendly Syrian people eternal peace."

Armenia has also provided tons of humanitarian aid to Syria throughout the civil war, most notably sending 40 tons of humanitarian aid including relief and food items in 2017. Armenian Ambassador Arshak Poladian stated that the aid “came under the directives of the President of Armenia and presented by the Armenian people.”

In 2022, the new Syrian Ambassador to Yerevan, Nora Arisian, a Syrian Armenian and former MP of the People's Assembly of Syria, was appointed. This step was perceived by both parties as a further development of mutual relations.

On 23 February 2023, Armenian Foreign Minister Ararat Mirzoyan arrived in Damascus, where he met with his counterpart Faisal Mekdad and President Bashar al-Assad.

Armenian genocide and Nagorno-Karabakh 
Syria recognized the Armenian genocide in 2015, becoming the second Arab state after Lebanon to do so, which was perceived positively by Armenia and Armenians. This came amidst the straining of relations between Syria and Turkey. The Turkish Government was angered over the recognition. Armenia is accused by both Turkey and Azerbaijan of allowing Syrian refugees to resettle in Karabakh, amidst diplomatic tensions between Turkey and Syria. 

In 2020, when the 2020 Nagorno-Karabakh conflict erupted, Syrian president Bashar al-Assad voiced his support for Armenia, accusing Turkey of sending terrorists into the region.

Cultural relations 
Around 120,000 people of Armenian descent live in Syria. They compose a majority in the towns of Kessab and Yakubiyah, and play a part in the political life of Syria. During the Armenian genocide, the Ottoman Empire used the Syrian desert of Deir ez-Zor as the main killing fields of Armenians. The native Arabs sheltered and supported the Armenians. 

A memorial complex commemorating this tragedy was opened in the city of Deir ez-Zor. It was designed by Sarkis Balmanoukian and was officially inaugurated in 1990 with the presence of the Armenian Catholicos of the Great House of Cilicia Karekin I. The complex contains bones and remnants recovered from the Deir ez-Zor desert of Armenian victims of the genocide and has become a pilgrim destination for many Armenians in remembrance of their dead, before being partially destroyed by ISIL.

See also 
Foreign relations of Armenia 
Foreign relations of Syria 
Armenians in Syria
Kessab

References

Bibliography

External links 
 Armenian Ministry of Foreign Affairs: direction of the Syrian embassy in Yerevan

 

 

 
Syria
Bilateral relations of Syria